Maniów may refer to the following places in Poland:
Maniów, Głogów County in Lower Silesian Voivodeship (south-west Poland)
Maniów, Wrocław County in Lower Silesian Voivodeship (south-west Poland)
Maniów, Lesser Poland Voivodeship (south Poland)
Maniów, Subcarpathian Voivodeship (south-east Poland)